Marc-André Blanchard (born November 10, 1965) is a Canadian executive, lawyer and former diplomat. He served as Permanent Representative of Canada to the United Nations, from April 1, 2016 until July 31, 2020.

Blanchard is a graduate of the Université de Montréal, the London School of Economics and Columbia University.  

Prior to his appointment to the United Nations, Blanchard was chairman and CEO of McCarthy Tétrault, one of Canada's largest law firms, and was president of the Quebec Liberal Party from 2000 to 2008. He served on Justin Trudeau's transition team following the 2015 election. 

In 2013, Blanchard was named among the 25 most influential lawyers in Canada by Canadian Lawyer Magazine, and Catalyst Canada awarded him the CEO Recognition Award for his leadership in gender diversity.

In 2016, was nominated to represent Trudeau's foreign policy at the United Nations as Permanent Representative of Canada to the U.N. That same year, Blanchard was awarded Advocatus Emeritus by the Quebec Bar Association. 

In 2017, he was named as a member of Canada's North American Free Trade Agreement (NAFTA) Council. On May 3, 2018 he was named as Canada's Representative to the Ismaili Imamat, an announcement coinciding with the Canadian Diamond Jubilee visit of the Aga Khan. Blanchard retired from his diplomatic postings on July 31, 2020, shortly after Canada lost the 2020 United Nations Security Council election.

Effective September 8, 2020, he is an executive vice-president of pension fund manager Caisse de dépôt et placement du Québec in charge of its CDPQ Global division, with responsibility for the United States/Latin America, Europe and Asia/Pacific.

References

1965 births
21st-century Canadian lawyers
20th-century Canadian lawyers
French Quebecers
Quebec Liberal Party politicians
Permanent Representatives of Canada to the United Nations
Living people
Canadian political party presidents